The Service Star (aka The Flag of Mothers) is an American silent film  directed by Charles Miller. The film stars Madge Kennedy as a young woman who pretends to be the fiancée of a famous flying ace during World War I. The film was copyrighted under the title The Flag of Mothers and was released in July 1918, four months before the end of the conflict.

Plot
Marilyn March (Madge Kennedy), a plain young girl from the country, lonely and unhappy because she alone of all the girls in her town does not have a soldier sweetheart, When she moves to Washington, D.C. at the outbreak of World War I, she begins to pretend to be the fiancée of John Whitney Marshall (Clarence Oliver), a famous combat aviator, and places a service star in her window.

When Mrs. Marshall (Maude Turner Gordon) the flyer's mother, learns of the "engagement," she accepts the girl as her future daughter-in-law, just in time for complications to arise in the form of the truth. John is also harboring a secret; he is a chemist and is still in the United States working on a chemical weapon for the government. The combat flyer who is in France is an imposter he sent. Marilyn is torn over her affection for John and revealing to the Selective Service board that he is a fraud. Events transpire that turn John into a legitimate hero that Marilyn can accept as her true love.

Cast

Madge Kennedy as Marily March
 Clarence Oliver as John Whitney Marshall
 Maude Turner Gordon as Mrs. Marshall
 Mabel Ballin as Gwendolyn Plummer
 Victory Bateman as Aunt Judith
 Tammany Young as Blinky
 William Bechtel as Finkelstein
 Jules Cowles as Jefferson
 Zula Ellsworth as Martha
 John A. Hemmingway as Civil War Veteran
 Phineas Billings as Civil War Veteran
 Isaac Wentworth as Civil War Veteran
 David Schuyler as Civil War Veteran

Production
According to publicity for The Service Star, some scenes were shot in Washington, D.C., as well as in various towns in northern New Jersey, and on Long Island, New York. While on location in Long Island, a parade of American Civil War veterans who gave a tribute to drafted boys leaving for boot camp was incorporated into the film.

Reception
Like many American films of the time, The Service Star was subject to cuts by city and state film censorship boards. For example, in Reel 5, the Chicago Board of Censors cut the shooting of the chemist.

The Service Star is a lost film. During its original release, it was paired with a short Harold Lloyd comedy in some theaters.

References

Notes

Bibliography

 Edwards, Paul M. World War I on Film: English Language Releases through 2014. Jefferson, North Carolina: 2016. .

External links
 
 allrovi/synopsis

1918 films
1910s war drama films
American silent feature films
American war drama films
American black-and-white films
Films set in France
Films set in Washington, D.C.
World War I aviation films
Films set on the United States home front during World War I
Lost American films
Goldwyn Pictures films
1918 lost films
Lost drama films
1918 drama films
Films directed by Charles Miller
Films shot in New Jersey
Films shot in New York (state)
Films about chemical war and weapons
Films shot in Washington, D.C.
Western Front (World War I) films
American World War I films
1910s American films
Silent American drama films
Silent war drama films
1910s English-language films